The Phantom Light is a 1935 British crime film, a low-budget "quota quickie" directed by Michael Powell and starring Binnie Hale, Gordon Harker, Donald Calthrop, Milton Rosmer and Ian Hunter. The screenplay concerns criminals who try to scare a new chief lighthouse keeper on the Welsh coast, in an attempt to distract him from their scheme.

Plot
Sam Higgins alights at the train station for the Welsh village of Tan-Y-Bwlch to take over the North Stack lighthouse, which is believed by the locals to be haunted. There, he meets Alice Bright. She asks him to take her along to the lighthouse, explaining that she belongs to a "psychic society" and wants to investigate the "legend of the phantom lighthouse". He turns her down.

Sam reports to Harbour Master David Owen, who informs him that Jack Davis, Sam's predecessor, "just disappeared", as did the chief lighthouse keeper before him. Owen confirms there was a major shipwreck a year ago, caused, so he believes, by the phantom light. Jim Pearce tries to bribe Sam to take him to the lighthouse; Sam guesses he is a reporter. Alice later overhears Jim ask about hiring a boat, so she tries her charms on him, but again fails.

When Owen, Dr. Carey and others take Sam by boat to the lighthouse, Carey examines Tom Evans, a mentally disturbed member of the resident staff. Evans tries to strangle the doctor, who decides he cannot be moved in his present state, to Sam's discomfort. Just to be safe, Sam ties Tom up. Sam's remaining assistants are Claff Owen (David's brother and Tom's uncle) and Bob Peters.

Then Jim shows up on a boat that is conveniently out of petrol. To Jim's surprise, he has a stowaway: Alice. Sam starts questioning his unwanted guests. Alice now tells him she is "an actress hiding from the police" because two admirers fought over her with knives.

Strange things start occurring. First a fire breaks out near Tom's bed. Then, Sam overhears Jim plotting something with Alice and admitting he is not a reporter. He fears they may be communist saboteurs. Jim has Alice hang a radio aerial out the window of the bunk room, but Tom (whom Claff has untied) sees her do it and sneaks up behind her. He hears Jim returning, so he hastily retreats to his bunk. When Sam shows up, Jim tells him that he is a naval officer after wreckers out to sink the Mary Fern for the insurance, most of the shares being held by the locals. Then Alice informs him that she is a detective from Scotland Yard.

Jim starts to transmit a warning to the approaching ship, but Bob and Claff are rendered unconscious, the light is sabotaged, and a decoy light is turned on. After Jim sends Alice to fetch Sam, Tom knocks Jim out and disables his radio. When Alice and Sam return, Tom locks them all in. Jim, however, climbs down the side of the lighthouse and swims to the village to alert the coast guard. Claff wakes up and unlocks the door, allowing Sam to set about repairing the light. They overhear Carey talking to Tom and learn that the doctor is the mastermind. The Mary Fern is saved just in time. Then, trapped at the top of the lighthouse, Carey decides to jump.

Cast
 Binnie Hale as Alice Bright  
 Gordon Harker as Sam Higgins  
 Donald Calthrop as David Owen  
 Milton Rosmer as Dr. Carey  
 Ian Hunter as Jim Pearce  
 Herbert Lomas as Claff Owen  
 Reginald Tate as Tom Evans  
 Barry O'Neill as Capt. Pearce 
 Mickey Brantford as Bob Peters  
 Alice O'Day as Mrs. Owen
 Fewlass Llewellyn as Griffith Owen  
 Edgar K. Bruce as Sergt. Owen  
 Louie Emery as Station Mistress

Production
The opening scenes were filmed at Tan y Bwlch station on the Festiniog Railway. The station is actually 7.5 miles from the coast. The station mistress was based on Bessie Jones, who lived in the station house with her husband at the time and who was famous for dressing up in authentic Welsh costume.  However the character portrayed in the film bore little resemblance to Bessie Jones in real life.

Reception
Writing for The Spectator, Graham Greene described the film as "an exciting, simple story" and compared its plot to that of Wilfrid Wilson Gibson's  poem Flannan Isle. Specific praise was given to actors Harker (for a "sure-fire Cockney performance") and Calthrop (whom Greene favourably compared to Charles Laughton). In Beacons in the Dark, film historian Robyn Ludwig praises the "suspense-thriller tone... [in which] characters inhabit an isolated, claustrophobic space in which loyalty cannot be assured, and allies and enemies cannot be easily distinguished."

Home media

The film has been released on Region 1 DVD by MPI along with Red Ensign (1934) and The Upturned Glass (1947).

The film has been released on Region 2 DVD by Opening in the "Les films de ma vie" series. The DVD has non-removable French subtitles for the original English soundtrack.
A digitally restored version of the film has also been released by Network DVD in Region 2.

References

External links 

 Reviews and articles at the Powell & Pressburger Pages

British black-and-white films
British crime thriller films
British mystery films
1930s English-language films
British films based on plays
Films by Powell and Pressburger
Films directed by Michael Powell
Films set in Wales
Quota quickies
Works set in lighthouses
1930s British films